Roxanne Saint (born November 5, 1977) is an American singer, musician, video producer, director, and actress who started singing at age 17. She's known for her role in the film Zombie Strippers and as the lead performer in the goth band Roxy Saint and the Blackouts.

Biography
An only child whose father died when she was two, Saint was raised in Southern California by her mother. She has one son, Jackson, with husband Josh Evans in December 2010.

Career
In the early 1990s, she was the vocalist for Hollywood band Never on Sunday. She went solo, and in 1995 released the CD Orphan Child, which contained rerecorded songs from her previous band. Her debut DVD release, however, which Saint directed and produced, was The Underground Personality Tapes in 2003. She toured in England, including performing at the Leeds and Reading festivals. Blog Critics called Saint "the next huge thing" and "PJ Harvey crossed with Sophia Coppola."

She has released her music, which include videos, as an indie producer, via DVDs, the Internet and digital downloads.
Saint contributed to the rock band Die Trying's self-named album with guest vocals on the single "Dirty, Dirty". 

She performed a song for the 1999 movie The Criminal, starring Steven Mackintosh, and a song for the 2002 film The Hot Chick, starring actor Rob Schneider.

KNAC radio's Mick Stingley, in a CD/DVD review of The Underground Personality Tapes, wrote that Saint was "New Wave retro cool, LA glammo sleaze-rock, with Boss Super Over-Drive distortion pedal to the floor" who "has something to offer." And in a 2004 interview, In Music We Trust Magazine described Saint's brand of music as "defying convention and going against logic."

Also in 2004, Saint, who's known for shopping for her clothes at thrift stores, launched her own clothing line titled Trash Couture with her dresses numbered and individually named ("Chaos," "Aquarius" and "Glitch"). MK Magazine described the line as "one-of-a-kind dresses made from black plastic trash bags."

The San Francisco Weekly wrote that during her 2005 European tour, Saint's belongings were stolen, which the paper said, "may have been the best thing that ever happened to her. ... Her slashed, duct-taped, hand-painted 'Trash Couture' creations were such a hit that she now sells them online."

Films
She co-starred, playing the role of Lillith, in the 2008 film Zombie Strippers, written and directed by Jay Lee.

In 2014, filming completed in Las Vegas for Death In The Desert, a full-length movie in which Saint plays the character Corey and performs an original song by record producer Chris Goss. Saint, an executive producer on the film, which is directed and produced by her husband, Evans, stars Michael Madsen, Shayla Beesley and Paz de la Huerta.

References

External links

American film actresses
Actresses from California
American punk rock guitarists
American punk rock singers
Record producers from California
Living people
Singers from California
Guitarists from California
1977 births
21st-century American women singers
American women record producers
21st-century American women guitarists
Evans family (Paramount Pictures)
21st-century American singers
Women punk rock singers